This Article is a list of United States Air Force aircraft control and warning squadrons active, inactive, and historical. The purpose of an aircraft control and warning squadron is to provide an airborne radar picket to detect vessels, planes, and vehicles before they enter an area of operations, as well as providing command and control in an engagement by directing aircraft strikes. Additionally they may be used to carry out surveillance, including over ground targets.

Site codes

Sites within the United States
 DC-xx Semi-Automatic Ground Environment (SAGE) Direction Center/Combat Center.
 F-xx Alaskan air defense sites.
 H-0x Hawaiian air defense sites.
 L-xx Original Air Defense Command (ADC) 1946 "Lashup" Radar Network of temporary sites to provide detection at designated important locations using radar sets left over from World War II.
 LP-xx "Lashup" site which was incorporated into the first ADC permanent radar network in 1949.
 P-xx Original 75 permanent stations established in 1949.
 RP-xx Sites that replaced a permanent 1949 station.
 M-xx 1952 Phase I Mobile Radar station.
 SM-xx 1955 Phase II Mobile Radar Station.
 TM-xx 1959 Phase III Mobile station.
 TT-x Texas Towers, radar tower rigs off the East Coast of the United States, named because of their resemblance to oil drilling rigs in the Gulf of Mexico.
 Z-xx NORAD designation for sites after 31 July 1963.  P, M, SM, and TM stations active after that date retained their numbers, but were designated "Z-xx".

Sites outside the United States
 C-xx ADC and Royal Canadian Air Force (RCAF) manned sites on the Canadian Pinetree Line.
 G-xx Sites in Greenland established by Northeast Air Command (NEAC) reassigned to ADC in 1957.  became N Sites, then C Sites, retaining their numbers.
 H-xx Air defense sites in Iceland.
 J-xx Sites in Japan. (includes main bases)
 K-xx Sites in Korea. (includes main bases)
 N-xx Pinetree Line sites in Newfoundland. Became C Sites, retaining their numbers.  Reassigned from NEAC to ADC in 1957.
 R-xx At least two sites in the Southern Pacific.
 W-xx sites in Spain.
 Y-xx sites in Morocco.

Aircraft control and warning squadrons

See also
 List of United States Air Force squadrons
 United States general surveillance radar stations

References

General

External links
 601st AC&W Squadron

 
Radar squadrons of the United States Air Force
Aircraft control and warning